Abdulfatah Ahmed (born 29 December 1963) is a Nigerian banker and politician. He is the former Governor of Kwara State.

Background

Ahmed was born on 29 December 1963 in Share, Ifelodun Local Government Area of Kwara State. 
He attended Government College Funtua, Katsina State (1973–1978) and the school of Basic Studies of Kwara State College of Technology (now Kwara State Polytechnic), Ilorin (1978–1980). He went on to the University of Ilorin where he earned a BSc in Chemistry (1986) and a Master of Business Administration (MBA, 1992).

Ahmed was a lecturer in Organic Chemistry and later Acting Head of Department at Federal College of Arts and Science, Sokoto, in Sokoto State (1986–1990).
He became an Assistant Manager at District Savings and Loans, Lagos (1991–1993). 
In 1993, he started work with Guaranty Trust Bank in the Credit and Marketing Unit.
In 1998, he moved to Societe Generale Bank Nigeria as a Senior Manager/Group Head, Consumer Banking. 
Later, he became Public Sector Group for the North West region.

Political career

Ahmed was appointed Commissioner for Finance and Economic Development at the start of Abubakar Bukola Saraki's Kwara State Administration (2003–2009). He then became Commissioner of the newly created Ministry of Planning and Economic Development.  During this period, Ahmed was also Treasurer of the forum of Commissioners of Finance in Nigeria for six years, and chairman, Budget Formulation Committee and Economic Team of Kwara State.  He was appointed a member of board of directors of the International Aviation College, Ilorin, Chairman of the Millennium Development Goals implementation committee and Chairman of Shonga Farms Holdings Ltd.

In the PDP primaries, Ahmed won 695 votes, defeating Chief Bashir Omoloja Bolarinwa (39 votes) and Alhaji Yekinni Alabi (9 votes).
In the 26 April 2011 elections, Ahmed won 254,969 votes. The runner-up, Dele Belgore of the Action Congress of Nigeria (ACN) scored 152,580 votes.

Ahmed announced his defection from the All Progressives Congress shortly after his predecessor and Senate President Bukola Saraki announced his resignation from the (APC) on July 31st 2018.

EFCC investigations and arrests

Fraud 
In December 2020, Ahmed was arrested by Nigerian authorities in connection with his alleged involvement in a long-running financial fraud.  The Economic and Financial Crimes Commission had been probing his wife's involvement as well.  The fraud may have reached two billion naira.

Diversion of Kwara public funds 
On 17 May 2021, the Economic and Financial Crimes Commission detained Ahmed for a second time after seven hours of interrogation over around ₦9 billion that were allegedly diverted from the Kwara State government. The money was alleged to have been diverted over the course of Ahmed’s time as Governor and his time as Finance Commissioner in the Governor Bukola Saraki administration.

Illegal sale and mismanagement of Kwara public assets 
In May 2021, the Judicial Commission of Inquiry on the sales of Kwara State Government Assets between May 1999 and May 2019, a commission set up by Kwara State Governor AbdulRahman AbdulRazaq, accused Ahmed of selling state assets at suspiciously low prices to cronies and recommended Ahmed along with his predecessor as Governor Bukola Saraki for prosecution. Saraki, along with Ahmed and others, were said to have illegally sold government properties outside the state and grossly mismanaged state assets.

See also
List of Hausa people
List of Governors of Kwara

References

Living people
1963 births
Nigerian Muslims
Governors of Kwara State
Peoples Democratic Party state governors of Nigeria
Yoruba politicians
All Progressives Congress politicians